Peter McKinney (16 December 1897 – 23 December 1979) was an early-twentieth-century English footballer who played professionally as a wing half in England and the United States.

McKinney played for Consett Celtic early in his career. He was signed by Liverpool where he played three games, scoring one goal, during the 1920–21 season. His first game came in October, the second in April and the third in Liverpool's last game of the season. At some point, he moved to the United States and in 1923, he signed with the New York Giants of the American Soccer League. He played for the Giants until the 1929–30 season. During the 1928–29 season, the Giants were expelled from the ASL as part of the "Soccer Wars" between the ASL and the United States Football Federation. They finished the season in the Eastern Soccer League before returning to the ASL in 1929.

References

External links
 LFChistory.net player profile

1897 births
1979 deaths
People from Leadgate, County Durham
Footballers from County Durham
English footballers
Association football wing halves
Consett A.F.C. players
Liverpool F.C. players
New York Giants (soccer) players
American Soccer League (1921–1933) players
Eastern Professional Soccer League (1928–29) players
English expatriate footballers
English expatriate sportspeople in the United States
Expatriate soccer players in the United States